Peter Belden Gilkey (born February 27, 1946 in Utica, New York) is an American mathematician, working in differential geometry and  global analysis.

Gilkey graduated from Yale University with a master 's degree in 1967 and received a doctoral degree in 1972 from the Harvard University under the supervision of Louis Nirenberg (Curvature and the Eigenvalues of the Laplacian for Geometrical Elliptic Complexes). From 1971 to 1972 he was an instructor in computer science at the New York University and from 1972 to 1974 was a lecturer at the University of California, Berkeley. From 1974 to 1980 he was assistant professor at Princeton University, he spent one year at U.S.C., and in 1981 he became associate professor and in 1985 professor at the University of Oregon.

He wrote a textbook on the Atiyah–Singer index theorem. In 1975 he was Sloan Fellow. He is a fellow of the American Mathematical Society.

Gilkey retired from the University of Oregon in June 2021 and is now a Professor Emeritus.

Writings 
  Online
 
 With Tohru Eguchi, Andrew J. Hanson Gravitation, Gauge Theories and Differential Geometry, Physics Reports, Volume 66, 1980, pp. 213–393

Notes

External links 
 Homepage

20th-century American mathematicians
Fellows of the American Mathematical Society
1946 births
Living people
New York University faculty
University of California, Berkeley College of Letters and Science faculty
University of Oregon faculty
Yale University alumni
Harvard University alumni
21st-century American mathematicians